Elo is a surname and a unisex given name. Notable people with the name are as follows:

Surname
 Arpad Elo (1903–1992), Hungarian-American creator of the Elo rating system
 Colmán Elo (555–611), Irish saint
 Dor Elo (born 1993), Israeli football player
 Eero Elo (born 1990), Finnish ice hockey player
 Jaakko Elo (1925–2017), Finnish physician
 Jere Elo (born 1992), Finnish ice hockey player
 Jorma Elo (born 1961), Finnish choreographer
 Michael Elo (born 1949), Danish musician
 Olavi Elo (1913–1979), Finnish sports shooter
 Pentti Elo (1929–1991), Finnish hockey player
 Simon Elo (born 1986), Finnish politician
 Tiina Elo (born 1971), Finnish politician
 Unto Elo (born 1944), Finnish sprint canoer

Given name
Elo Edeferioka (born 1993), Nigerian basketball player
Elo Romančík (1922–2012), Slovak actor
Elo Viiding (born 1974), Estonian poet and writer

Finnish-language surnames
Estonian feminine given names
Unisex given names